Highway 323 is a highway in Quebec that runs from the junction of Route 148 in Montebello to the junction of Route 117 in Mont-Tremblant. This highway is along the main route between Ottawa and the ski resort of Mont-Tremblant.

History
Before the bypass was built in 2008, road conditions were often criticized. Several pot holes, and cracks in the asphalt made this narrow road a long trip for many drivers. This section, now bypassing Lac-des-Plages, was opened to traffic in the fall of 2008.

The narrow section northeast of Lac-des-Plages closer to Amherst had many turns and was prone to flooding, resulting in Highway 323 being closed on occasion, especially in springtime. It was straightened and realigned away from the river in March 2007. Work involved significant tree cutting and blasting. It was opened in the fall of 2009.

Municipalities along Route 323
 Montebello
 Notre-Dame-de-Bonsecours
 Papineauville
 Saint-André-Avellin
 Notre-Dame-de-la-Paix
 Namur
 Saint-Émile-de-Suffolk
 Lac-des-Plages
 Amherst
 Brébeuf
 Mont-Tremblant

Major intersections

See also
 List of Quebec provincial highways

References

External links 
 Official Transports Quebec Road Map Network  
 Route 323 on Google Maps

323